Gerald Friedman may refer to:

Gerald M. Friedman (1921–2011), professor of geology
Gerald Friedman (economist), economist at the University of Massachusetts at Amherst
 Gerald Friedman (judge), South African judge

See also
Gerald Freedman (born 1927), American theater director